The Jamaican red-tailed hawk (Buteo jamaicensis jamaicensis) is the nominate subspecies of the red-tailed hawk (Buteo jamaicensis), a bird of prey of North America. The subspecies B. j. jamaicensis occurs in the northern West Indies, including Jamaica, Hispaniola, Puerto Rico and the Lesser Antilles, but not the Bahamas or Cuba, where it is replaced by the Cuban red-tailed hawk (B. j. solitudinis). El Yunque National Forest, Puerto Rico, holds some of the highest known density of Jamaican red-tailed hawks. The bird is referred to as a guaraguao (a Taino term) in the Dominican Republic and Puerto Rico.

Description
This is the smallest-bodied subspecies of the red-tailed hawk. In terms of body mass, two Puerto Rican males were found to average  and two females averaged . Although claimed as the most sexually dimorphic subspecies by size, neither body mass nor linear dimensions seem to support this. This subspecies has less mottling than northern red-tails on the back, lacks the white tip at the end of the rectrices and, most characteristically, has a very broad, but raggedly edged, black belly band.

References 

Jamaican red-tailed hawk
Birds of the Dominican Republic